Deybuk (Dargwa: ДейбукI) is a rural locality (a selo) in Sagasi-Deybuksky Selsoviet, Kayakentsky District, Republic of Dagestan, Russia. The population was 435 as of 2010.

Nationalities 
Dargins live there.

Geography
Deybuk is located 8 km southwest of Novokayakent (the district's administrative centre) by road. Kishcha and Meusisha are the nearest rural localities.

References 

Rural localities in Kayakentsky District